PCP(M-L) may refer to:

 Communist Party of Portugal (Marxist–Leninist)
 Communist Party of Portugal (Marxist–Leninist) (1974)
 Paraguayan Communist Party (Marxist–Leninist)